This is a list of airlines currently operating in Fiji.

See also
 List of airlines
 List of defunct airlines of Oceania

Fiji
Airlines
Airlines
Fiji